Muro is a small municipality on Majorca, one of the Balearic Islands, which is a part of Spain. It is located in the north-east of the island.

International relations

Twin towns - sister cities
Muro is twinned with:
 Dębica in Poland

References

Municipalities in Mallorca
Populated places in Mallorca